Judith Jesch  (born 1954) is professor of Viking Age studies at the University of Nottingham. Jesch is chair of the international Runic Advisory Group and president of the English Place-Name Society.

Biography
Jesch received her advanced education at Durham University and University College London. As a student at Durham in 1973 she co-wrote an article for Palatinate that accused the university of failing to attract candidates from a wide variety of backgrounds, and suggested that Durham was by now seen as a 'finishing school' for the socially privileged.   

She was keynote speaker at the 2015 Norse in the North Conference, and is the Director of the Centre for the Study of the Viking Age (CSVA)

She is a fellow of the Royal Historical Society, the Society of Antiquaries of London and the Society of Antiquaries of Scotland.

Selected publications

Epigraphic Literacy and Christian Identity. Brepols, 2012. (Edited with K. Zilmer) 
Viking Poetry of Love and War. The British Museum Press, 2013. 
 "Earl Rögnvaldr of Orkney: A Poet of the Viking Diaspora", Journal of the North Atlantic, Special Volume 4, 2013, pp. 154–60.
"Runes and Words: Runic Lexicography in Context", Futhark: International Journal of Runic Studies. 4, 77-100, 2013.

Edited

References

External links 
Judith Jesch | University of Nottingham - Academia.edu

Academics of the University of Nottingham
Alumni of University College London
Fellows of the Royal Historical Society
Fellows of the Society of Antiquaries of London
Fellows of the Society of Antiquaries of Scotland
British women historians
Living people
1954 births
21st-century English writers
21st-century British women writers
Alumni of St Aidan's College, Durham